A computer security model is a scheme for specifying and enforcing security policies. A security model may be founded upon a formal model of access rights, a model of computation, a model of distributed computing, or no particular theoretical grounding at all. A computer security model is implemented through a computer security policy.

For a more complete list of available articles on specific security models, see :Category:Computer security models.

Selected topics
 Access control list (ACL)
 Attribute-based access control (ABAC)
 Bell–LaPadula model
 Biba model 
 Brewer and Nash model
 Capability-based security
 Clark-Wilson model
 Context-based access control (CBAC)
 Graham-Denning model
 Harrison-Ruzzo-Ullman (HRU)
 High-water mark (computer security)
 Lattice-based access control (LBAC)
 Mandatory access control (MAC)
 Multi-level security (MLS)
 Non-interference (security)
 Object-capability model
 Protection ring
 Role-based access control (RBAC)
 Take-grant protection model
 Discretionary access control (DAC)

References
 Krutz, Ronald L. and Vines, Russell Dean, The CISSP Prep Guide; Gold Edition, Wiley Publishing, Inc., Indianapolis, Indiana, 2003.
 CISSP Boot Camp Student Guide, Book 1 (v.082807), Vigilar, Inc.

Computer security models